Peter Dickson is a Northern Irish voice-over artist. He is best known as the brand voice of The X Factor and Britain’s Got Talent and also as the voice of television channel E4. His other work includes Ireland's Got Talent, The Price Is Right, Family Fortunes and All Star Mr & Mrs.

Career
Dickson was educated at the Belfast Royal Academy in his home city of Belfast, Northern Ireland. He later graduated with a BA Hons degree in psychology from Queens University. While there he was a member of the University Air Squadron, where he flew the Bulldog. He was a reporter and journalist at the BBC, later moving to the presentation department at Radio Ulster. From there he moved on to BBC Radio 2 as a newsreader and announcer, also presenting overnight shows and his own comedy-based Friday show Peter Dickson's Nightcap.

During the 1980s and early 1990s, Dickson worked alongside Steve Wright on his Radio 1 afternoon and morning shows. He created, wrote and voiced many household name characters for Wright's award-winning programmes. In 1990, he launched Melody Radio in London, where he presented the breakfast show for three years. He has contributed to two series of Quote Unquote for BBC Radio 4, and has read the morning story on BBC Radio 4.

Playwright Dennis Potter invited Dickson to play cameo parts in several of his TV dramas. More television beckoned with Harry Enfield in his award-winning Tiger Aspect series Harry Enfield and Chums. Various on screen character roles followed in the first two series of Steve Wright People's Show for BBC One. Bruce Forsyth called Dickson to voice the famous "Come on Downs" and prize descriptions for seven series of ITV's Bruce's Price is Right and he was on board for Family Fortunes starring Les Dennis, and Patrick Kielty's Channel 4's Last Chance Lottery Live. He provided the commentaries for the world record attempts on Sky 1's Guinness World Records Smashed in 2009. He has also contributed to 11 series of the award-winning BBC One panel game They Think It's All Over presented by Nick Hancock, Catchphrase, TV's Naughtiest Blunders and Safe for ITV and the cult animation series Monkey Dust for BBC in which he famously played himself.

His other TV credits include Never Mind The Buzzcocks, roles in Holby City, Noel's House Party and Live & Kicking, The 10%'ers and The Unknown Soldier for Carlton TV. He has featured on Griff Rhys Jones' Crystal Balls, Tales from FEAR for Cartoon Network, Sing It Your Way with Denise Van Outen and Ian Wright, and ITV's Year of Promise with Carol Vorderman.

Dickson has written for the BBC Two comedy series The Fast Show and Play Your Cards Right for ITV.

He worked on Jerry Springer's ITV Friday night hit programme, and his subsequent Late Night With Jerry Springer for Five which ran for two series.

He was the voice of the BBC's Test the Nation live specials and has featured in Little Britain, The Paul O'Grady Show on ITV and the New Paul O'Grady Show on Channel 4. He provided the live commentary for Cirque de Celebrite and introduced An Audience with Joe Pasquale, and voiced a Westlife special on ITV.

In 2006, Dickson became the brand voice of youth channel E4.

In 2011 and in 2012 he was the host of MTV's three big end-of-year video chart shows.

In 2012 he was the official voice of Olympic Beach Volleyball at the London 2012 Olympic Games.

Documentaries

Since 1998 Dickson has worked closely with the Discovery Channel, narrating over 250 documentaries, including the 25 part The FBI Files. He has completed over 150 other documentary series for BBC Television, National Geographic Channel, Wall to Wall TV, The History Channel, Outline Productions, Adrenaline TV, Café Productions, Discovery Health, and Flat Earth Films. He narrated the 13 part series World War 2: The Complete History, and the 50 part Millennium Minute.

Radio
Beyond his earlier radio work, Dickson's voice is heard daily on many commercial radio stations across the UK. He has voiced many advertising campaigns including Dominos, Money Supermarket, British Gas, Downton Abbey, The Sun, Branston Pickle, Walls, Euro Millions, Dairylea, Schweppes, KFC, Heinz and Wrigleys. He has voiced over 30,000 radio and TV campaigns. He was the brand voice for Irish radio stations I 102–104 and 4FM. He was the brand voice of The Christian O'Connell Breakfast Show on Absolute Radio. He makes appearances on BBC Radio 1's breakfast and drive time shows.

He played various character roles in The Department, a comedy series on BBC Radio 4 starring and written by Chris Addison, John Oliver, and Andy Zaltzman.

Music
In March 2009, Dickson released a UK single as Voiceover Man and The Credit Crunchers called "What a Bunch of Bankers".

Credits

Television
Paddy's Show and Telly
OOglies
Monkey Dust
All Star Mr & Mrs
Vic Reeves Big Night Out
E4
The X Factor (2004–2018)
Britain's Got Talent (2007–2016)
Ireland's Got Talent (2018–2019)
They Think It's All Over
The Price Is Right (Bruce Forsyth and Joe Pasquale versions)
Catchphrase
Gameshow Marathon
Soapstar Superstar
The Paul O'Grady Show
Family Fortunes
All Star Family Fortunes
Test the Nation
Last Chance Lottery
Guinness World Records Smashed
The Fall of the British Empire
Stalemate
The Young Elizabeth
George and Elizabeth
Churchill
Superted
Margaret Royal Rebel (Five)
Search for Destiny
Mountbatten
Edward VIII
Charles
Aircraft Stories (Discovery Wings)
Air Traffic Control (Discovery Wings)
Abbamania (ITV)
Christmas Mania (ITV)
It'll Be Alright on the Night 12
Today with Des and Mel
Mission: 2110
Brainiac: Science Abuse
Russell Howard's Good News (BBC)

Video games
Official Formula 1 game (by Eidos)
Monster World
Xenoblade Chronicles – English VA of Sorean Antiqua
Blades of Time
Fable
Fable II
Folklore (Faery Lord)
Dragon Quest
Evolva
Lotus Challenge
Flying Heroes
Atrox
Pizza Connection II
Kinect Sports (the Announcer)
Kinect Sports: Season Two
The FBI Files

Books
Voiceover Man - The Extraordinary Story of a Professional Voice Actor (Provox Publishing)

References

External links
PeterDickson.co.uk

Living people
British radio personalities
British television presenters
Radio and television announcers
Television personalities from Belfast
Year of birth missing (living people)